Communist Reconstruction Party (in Albanian: Partia Komuniste e Rindertuar) was a communist party in Albania led by Rasi Brahimit. The party was legalized in 1998, the second communist party that was legally registered post-1991. On 5 June 1999 the party merged into the Party of United Communists of Albania (PKBSH).

References 

Defunct political parties in Albania
Communist parties in Albania
Anti-revisionist organizations
Political parties established in 1998
Political parties disestablished in 1999
1998 establishments in Albania
1999 disestablishments in Albania